The Seven Spirits of Ra is an action-adventure game for DOS published by Sir-Tech in 1987.

Gameplay
The Seven Spirits of Ra is a game in which the player is the god Osiris.

Reception
Alan Roberts reviewed the game for Computer Gaming World, and stated that "Even though the game is not as tough as it should be, the game is worthy of an above average recommendation and it must be given an extremely strong recommendation for arcade addicts and teachers."

References

External links
Review in PC Magazine
Interview with the authors at Mobygames

1987 video games
Action-adventure games
DOS games
DOS-only games
Sir-Tech games
Video games based on Egyptian mythology
Video games developed in the United States
Video games set in antiquity
Video games set in Egypt